Among those who were born in the London Borough of Hackney, or have dwelt within the borders of the modern borough are (alphabetical order, within category):

Notable residents

Academia and research

Arts and entertainment
 Zak Abel (born 1995), English singer-songwriter, musician, and Cadet national table tennis champion
 Jamie Adenuga, Grime rapper, known as JME; co-founder of Boy Better Know
 Joseph Adenuga, Grime artist, songwriter and record producer. Better known as "Skepta"
 Freema Agyeman, actress, born and brought up on the Woodberry Down estate.
 Eileen Atkins, actress
 Derek Bailey, avant-garde guitarist and leading figure in the free improvisation movement
 FKA twigs, avant-garde and alternative R&B musician, artist and dancer, lives in Hackney
 Jeremy Beadle, television presenter
 David Bendeth, born in Hackney, Music Producer, Artist, Songwriter, Mixer
 Steven Berkoff, playwright and actor, educated at Hackney Downs School.
 Lionel Blair, Canadian-born British actor, grew up at Stamford Hill 
 Buster Bloodvessel, born Douglas Trendle, singer and frontman of Bad Manners, lived at Clapton Common
 Marc Bolan, musician, born at Homerton and brought up at Stoke Newington Common.
 Richard 'Abs' Breen, singer and member of pop band Five; raised in Hackney
 Gary Brooker, musician, founder of Procol Harum, born in Hackney Hospital
 Tobi Brown, YouTuber, internet personality and member of the Sidemen; born in Hackney
 Bernard Butler, guitarist, known for his time with Suede; born in Stamford Hill
 Michael Caine, actor, educated at Hackney Downs School
 Paigey Cakey, MC, born in Hackney
 Phil Collen, guitarist with Def Leppard
 Steve Conway, singer (1920–1952), lived in Hackney
 Adam Deacon, actor, brought up in Stoke Newington
 Rob Dean, guitarist of new wave band Japan; was associated in his first years with Clapton (probably was born and/or brought up there)

 DJ Dextrous, born Errol Francis, Ivor Novello Award- and BAFTA Award-winning producer and DJ known as Dextrous; born in Stoke Newington
 DJ Luck, born Joel Samuels, from the garage duo DJ Luck & MC Neat
 Pete Doherty, musician, lived in a flat in Hackney which was the site of many after-gig parties for his fans
 Idris Elba, actor and musician
 Paloma Faith, singer-songwriter, born and lived in Stoke Newington
 Michael Fassbender, actor, lives in Hackney
 Noel Fielding, comedian, as Vince Noir in The Mighty Boosh and The Great British Bake Off host. 
 Colin Firth, actor, lived at Sutton Place, Homerton
 Green Gartside, musician and frontman of Scritti Politti; lives in Dalston and formed his band in a Hackney pub
 Professor Green, rapper and singer; lived in Clapton 
 Charlie Harper, British singer and songwriter, lead singer of the punk band U.K. Subs. Born in Hackney.
 Carol Harrison, actress, known as Louise Raymond in EastEnders; lives at Victoria Park, South Hackney
 Sara Hennell, author. 
 Gwyneth Herbert, singer-songwriter, lives in the borough. 
 Maddy Hill, actress, known for her role as Nancy Carter in EastEnders
 Alfred Hitchcock, film director, began his career at the Gainsborough Studios in Shoreditch.
 Dave Kaye, pianist, born in Shoreditch; later lived in Stamford Hill

 Hetty King, male impersonator of the music hall era; born in Shoreditch
 Labrinth, singer-songwriter and music producer
 Leona Lewis, singer, songwriter, first female winner of The X Factor; lived in Stamford Hill
 Marie Lloyd, entertainer, born in Hoxton and lived her later life in Hackney.
 Lily Loveless, actress from BAFTA Award-winning drama Skins; born in Finsbury Park, London
 Peter Lowe, artist, born at Victoria Park, South Hackney
 Syrie Maugham, interior decorator
 Nicko McBrain, drummer for Iron Maiden
 Hoxton Tom McCourt, musician, face, born in Shoreditch and lived in Hoxton
 Martine McCutcheon, actress and singer
 Lenny McLean, bare knuckle/unlicensed boxer, actor, born in Hoxton
 Tom McRae, singer and songwriter, lived in Dalston and Hackney
 Bill Meyer, printmaker and artist
 Dicky Moore, musician
 Esau Mwamwaya, Malawian singer
 Trevor Nelson, disc jockey for BBC Radio 1 and BBC Radio 1Xtra
 Anthony Newley, actor and singer, born in Homerton
 Pauline Quirke, born Stoke Newington, English actress, best known for her role as "Sharon Theodopolopodous" in the long-running comedy TV series Birds of a Feather
 Tom Raworth, poet and visual artist, lived in Amhurst Road in the early 1960s
 Mike Reid, actor and comedian
 Rudimental, drum and bass group
 Bree Runway, born Brenda Wireko Mensah, musician, born in the borough.
 DJ Ron, Jungle, Drum and Bass producer, DJ and film maker
 Maverick Sabre, vocalist and rapper
 Helen Shapiro, singer, educated at Clapton Park Girls School
 Daniel Sharman, actor, known for his roles in Teen Wolf and The Originals.
 Aba Shanti-I, born Joseph Smith, sound system operator and dub producer
 Matt Shultz, co-founder of band Cage the Elephant; lived in Lower Clapton Road in the early 2000s
 Marina Sirtis, actress, known for her role as Deanna Troi from sci-fi series Star Trek: The Next Generation; raised in Harringay.
 Anthony Smee, theatre producer, writer, stage, radio, television and film actor
 Adrian Smith, guitarist with Iron Maiden
 Jessica Tandy, actress, born in Clapton.
 John Varley (painter), 1778-1842
 Sid Vicious, born John Simon Ritchie, musician and singer with the Sex Pistols
 Arnold Wesker, playwright, educated at Upton House Secondary School
 Robert Westerby, British (The Invisible Man (1958 TV series)), and Hollywood (The Three Lives of Thomasina), screenwriter; author; boxer.
 Rachel Whiteread, artist, lives and works in Dalston.
 Barbara Windsor, actress, born in Shoreditch and lived in Stoke Newington
 Ray Winstone, actor, born in Homerton.

Business and finance

Crime

Engineering and technology

Journalism and the media

Literature

Medicine
 John Aikin, physician and author (Evenings at Home), brother of ALB
 Silvanus Bevan (1691–1765), apothecary and Fellow of the Royal Society
 Edith Cavell, nurse and spy executed in Belgium in 1915, worked at St Leonard's Hospital
 John Coakley Lettsome, Quaker physician and abolitionist
 James Parkinson, physician and researcher; known for identifying Parkinson's disease; lived in Hoxton
 Hannah Woolley (1622 – c.1675), writer, amateur physician and advocate for female education; opened a school in Hackney

Politics and government
 Henry Allingham, briefly the world's oldest man and World War I veteran
 Major John André, soldier, executed as a spy by George Washington, lived with his Huguenot family at Lower Clapton
 Tony Blair, former British Prime Minister, lived at 59 Mapledene Road in London Fields 1980–86.
 Paul Boateng, previously High Commissioner to South Africa, Chief Secretary to the Treasury, and Labour Party Member of Parliament for Brent South; born in Hackney
 Harry Cohen, Labour Member of Parliament, born in Hackney
 William Randal Cremer, Liberal MP for Haggerston; pacifist; winner of the 1903 Nobel Peace Prize.
 David Hallam British Labour politician, educated at Upton House Secondary School, Homerton.
 John Howard, prison reformer, born and raised in Lower Clapton
 John Hunter, governor of New South Wales lived and is buried in Hackney
 Samuel Morley, philanthropist and abolitionist, born in Homerton and lived in Stamford Hill
 Colonel John Okey, regicide of Charles I, lived in Hackney
 Nat Wei, youngest Life Peer ever to enter the House of Lords; social entrepreneur and senior advisor to the Cabinet Office on Big Society; currently living in Haggerston

Religion

Arguably, all the English Dissenters associated with Newington Green Unitarian Church, as the church itself lies within Hackney, although the rest of the green (and thus most of the houses) belong to Islington. Notable ministers of the church:
 Richard Price, political radical who preached on the French and American Revolutions (see Revolution controversy)
 Thomas Rees, leading authority of the history of Unitarianism, and made connections with the Unitarian Church of Transylvania
The Little Sisters of Jesus are a Roman Catholic community of religious sisters inspired by the life and writings of Charles de Foucauld, founded in Algeria in 1939 by Little Sister Magdeleine of Jesus (Madeleine Hutin).  They have had a community of Sisters at their council flat at Fellows Court in Weymouth Terrace, Haggerston Hackney since the early 1990s.

Sport
 William Barber, first-class cricketer
 Eric Bristow, darts champion
 Edward Cuthbertson, cricketer
 Kieran Dixon, professional Rugby league player for London Broncos, Hull KR
 Leonard Garrett, footballer
 Bert Goodman, professional footballer, born in Dalston
 Len Goulden, footballer for West Ham United and England.
 Ron 'Chopper' Harris, footballer for Chelsea F.C., raised in Hackney and attended Upton House School with footballer brother Alan Harris
 Tao Geoghegan Hart, professional cyclist, born in Hackney
 Shaka Hislop, former goalkeeper for West Ham United and Trinidad and Tobago, born in Hackney
 Phillips Idowu, world champion triple jumper, born and grew up in Hackney.
 John Kane (born 1960), footballer
 Anne Keothavong, tennis player; grew up in Hackney and learned to play on park courts in the borough; still lives in Hackney.
 John Lewis (born 1954), footballer
 Kevin Lisbie, football player for Charlton Athletic, born in Hackney
 Michael Page, professional boxer and mixed martial artist; lives in Hackney.
 Phil Gilman, darts player
 Sanchez Watt, professional footballer playing for [Wealdstone]
 Kaiyne Woolery, professional footballer for Tranmere Rovers
 Anthony Yarde, professional boxer
 Lawrence Okolie, professional boxer, attended Stoke Newington School

References

Hackney